"The Long March" was an American television play broadcast on October 16, 1958, as part of the CBS television series, Playhouse 90.

Plot
Lt. Col. Rocky Thompson orders a group of Marines a 36-mile march after a training mission.

Cast
The cast included the following:

 Jack Carson as Capt. Al Mannix
 Mona Freeman as Betsy Tendler
 Rod Taylor as Lt. Warren Culver
 Sterling Hayden as Lt. Col. Rocky Templeton
 James Congdon as Pvt. Jimmy Hobbs
 Paul Lambert as Major Lawrence
 Harvey Stephens as Col. Price
 Jason Wingreen as Master Sgt. Walter O'Leary
 Fletcher Allen as Pvt. Leadbetter
 Harry Davidson as Capt. Oliphant
 Pauline Meyers as Margaret
 Robert Cass as Headquarters Corporal
 Bob Duggan as Private First Class
 William Benedict as First Private
 Joe Bishop Second Private
 Garry Walberg as Command Post Lieutenant
 Warren Frost as Command Post Sergeant
 Eve McVeagh as Woman in Bar

Edward G. Robinson hosted the broadcast.

Production
The program aired on October 16, 1958, on the CBS television series Playhouse 90. It was written by Roger O. Hirson, based on William Styron's novel. Fred Coe was the producer and Delbert Mann the director.

References

1958 American television episodes
Playhouse 90 (season 3) episodes
1958 television plays